Ichneutica rufistriga is a moth of the family Noctuidae. This species is endemic to New Zealand and is only found in the Antipodes Islands. The larvae of I. rufistriga feed on various host species including Urtica australis and have been reared on Rumex obtusifolius, Stellaria media and Rheum rhabarbarum. It has been hypothesised the larvae might also feed on Austroblechnum durum. The larvae pupate in a cocoon buried in the soil. In captivity it took 12 weeks to raise a generation from egg to adult. Adults of this species have been recorded as being on the wing from October to February.

Taxonomy 
This species was first described by Robert Hoare in 2019. The male holotype specimen was collected at Reef Point on Antipodes Island and reared by Brian H. Patrick. This specimen is held at the New Zealand Arthropod Collection.

Description 
The larvae of this species have been described as pale green becoming reddish and as they mature they have a "broad white lateral band and three thin white dorsal lines on a dull green / brown ground colour, with rows of black dots dorsally". The mature larvae were described by Brian H. Patrick as follows:

The wingspan of the adult male of I. rufistriga is between 38 and 44 mm and for the adult female is between 37 and 44 mm. This species is unlikely to be confused with other species found in the Antipodes Islands. It has been confused with I. ustistriga in collections but is smaller in size, has narrower forewings and the markings on its forewings are not as contrasting as with I. ustistriga.

Distribution 
This species is endemic to New Zealand and is only found in the Antipodes Islands.

Behaviour 
Adults of this species have been recorded as being on the wing from October to February.

Life history and host species 

The larvae of I. rufistriga feed on various host species including Urtica australis and have been reared on Rumex obtusifolius, Stellaria media and Rheum rhabarbarum. It has been hypothesised the larvae might also feed on Austroblechnum durum. The larvae pupate in a cocoon buried in the soil. In captivity it took 12 weeks to raise a generation from egg to adult.

References 

Moths described in 2019
Moths of New Zealand
 Noctuinae
Endemic fauna of New Zealand
Taxa named by Robert Hoare
Endemic moths of New Zealand